The 1926 season was the 43rd season of regional competitive association football in Australia.

League competitions

Cup competitions

(Note: figures in parentheses display the club's competition record as winners/runners-up.)

See also
 Soccer in Australia

References

Seasons in Australian soccer
1926 in Australian sport
Australian soccer by year
Australian soccer